There's No Leaving Now is the third studio album by Swedish folk artist The Tallest Man on Earth, released on 11 June 2012 on Dead Oceans. The album was preceded by the single "1904", released as a digital download on 15 May 2012. The track was also made available as a free download on Rolling Stone'''s official website.

Background
The album was recorded during a five-month-long session in Kristian Matsson's home, where he lived with his then wife Amanda Hollingby Matsson. 
The release of the album was announced in March 2012, together with the record's track list and artwork.
During an interview released to American magazine Rolling Stone, Matsson explained the sound of There's No Leaving Now:
"I wanted to build something that didn't sound like a rock band, but wasn't super minimalistic. I wanted a sound that had that brittle [quality], that feeling that it might just fall apart."
Lyrically, the album is focused on the willingness to confront and deal with your own weaknesses, as opposed to the theme of running away, which was recurring on his previous works.

Commercial performance

The album debuted in the United States at No. 14 on Top Rock Albums, No. 2 on Folk Albums, and No. 35 on Billboard'' 200, with 12,000 sold in its first week. The album has sold 58,000 copies in the US as of May 2015.

Track listing

Personnel
Musicians
Kristian Matsson - vocals, guitars, piano, various instruments
Mats Winkvist - bass (1, 2, 4, 6 and 7)
Niclas Nordin - drums  (2 and 4)

Recording personnel
Kristian Matsson - producer, recording, mixing
Jakob Grundtman - mixing
Joe Laporta - mastering

Artwork
Amanda Matsson - picture
Daniel Murphy - sleeve

Charts

Release history

See also
 List of UK Indie Breakers Chart number-one albums of the 2010s

References

External links
 There's No Leaving Now at Metacritic
 The Tallest Man on Earth's official website

2012 albums
The Tallest Man on Earth albums
Dead Oceans albums